Shaikh Abdul Hannan (born 1 August 1963)  is a four-star Air chief marshal and the current Chief of Air Staff of the Bangladesh Air Force. On 12 June 2021, Hannan took over command of the Bangladesh Air Force from his predecessor Masihuzzaman Serniabat.

Career

Hannan was commissioned on 14 July 1984 as a General Duties Pilot. The Air Chief Marshal is a category 'A' pilot and a Qualified Flying Instructor. He also holds the Proficiency Wing and is Chief Examiner of Helicopter Examiner Board of MI-17/171. An alumnus of Defence Services Command and Staff College (DSCSC), Mirpur, Hannan graduated from Pakistan Air Force Air War College, in 1999 and received his MDS and MSS degrees. He is the Top Graduate' of the 2014 class of National Defence University, Islamabad, where he received his M Sc in National Security and War Studies while completing the National Security and War Course (nswc).

Hannan served in the United Nations Protection Force in Bosnia Herzegovina (UNPROFOR) in 1995. He also led the BAF Contingent (BAN AIR-4) in the United Nations Mission in the Democratic Republic of the Congo (MONUC) in 2006-07.

On 12 June 2021, Prime Minister of Bangladesh Sheikh Hasina appointed Hannan as Chief of Air Staff and he assumed charge on 12 June 2021.

Personal life 
The Air Chief Marshal is married to Tahmida Hannan and the couple is blessed with a son.

References

Bangladesh Air Force air marshals
Chiefs of Air Staff (Bangladesh)
Living people
1963 births
National Defence College (Bangladesh) alumni